The 2022–23 Mississippi Valley State Delta Devils basketball team represented Mississippi Valley State University during the 2022–23 NCAA Division I men's basketball season. The Delta Devils were led by first-year head coach George Ivory. They played their home games at the Harrison HPER Complex in Itta Bena, Mississippi as members of the Southwestern Athletic Conference.

Previous season 
The Delta Devils finished the 2021–22 season 2–26, 2–16 in SWAC play to finish 12th in the conference. They failed to qualify for the SWAC tournament. 

With three games remaining in the season, head coach Lindsey Hunter was suspended. The school named former Arkansas-Pine Bluff head coach and MVSU player George Ivory the interim coach. On March 11, 2022, Hunter resigned as head coach. On March 14, the school named former Ivory the team's new head coach.

Roster

Schedule and results  

|-
!colspan=12 style=| Non-conference regular season

|-
!colspan=12 style=| SWAC regular season

Source

References 

Mississippi Valley State Delta Devils basketball seasons
Mississippi Valley State
Mississippi Valley State Delta Devils
Mississippi Valley State Delta Devils